Qing Yan Garden is located in Huai'an City, Jiangsu Province, China. It is the most representative classical garden in the northern district of the Jiangsu Province. It blends the "generosity of the North" and the "exquisiteness of the South". During the Qing dynasty, the grounds of the Garden were on the office of the Viceroy of Southern Rivers.

History
Qing Yan Garden was first built in seventeenth year of the reign of the Kangxi Emperor (1678) in the Qing dynasty. It has a history of more than 300 years, and is the only well-preserved classical garden in Huai'an City. According to the County Annals of Huai River, Qing Yan Garden, was once called Huai Garden, Zhan Garden, Liu Garden and Southern Garden of the City. In 1994, on the National Day, it resumed its old name—Qing Yan Garden. In the garden pavilions are in picturesque disorder, and meanwhile, meanderings, long porches and running water move in circles.

Structure
Qing Yan Garden consists of five parts. The first part contains some archaized constructions, such as Huai Xiang Pavilion, Jiao Yin Pavilion and Lai Jinyu Pavilion. It also includes a Rose Garden. The second structure is Emperor Guan Temple located in the northwest. In the southwest is the Ye Garden. The He Fang Academy is north of the lotus pond and includes a valuable library. The last one has some tourists attractions like rockery and a curved bridge.

See also
 List of Chinese gardens

References 
Qing Yan Garden
Trips to Qing Yan Garden

Botanical gardens in China
Gardens in Jiangsu
Huai'an